Aaraam Thampuran is a 1997 Indian Malayalam-language action drama film directed by Shaji Kailas, written by Ranjith and produced by Revathy Kalamandhir. It stars Mohanlal in the title role with Narendra Prasad, Manju Warrier, Sai Kumar, Oduvil Unnikrishnan, Cochin Haneefa and Srividya in supporting roles. The story follows Jagannadhan (Mohanlal), a former Mumbai-based enforcer who buys an old kovilakam (royal manor) named Kanimangalam and shifts the balance of power in that village, and he comes to be known as Aaram Thampuran (sixth lord). The film features original songs composed by Raveendran. The film completed more than 250 days theatrical run and become the highest-grossing Malayalam film of 1997 and highest grossing Malayalam movie till then.

Plot 
Nandakumar is a business tycoon in Mumbai, who faces huge financial loss when his manager Abey Mathew decides to broker a deal with an Australian group and another rival Indian firm. Nandakumar calls up his  friend and enforcer Jagannadhan, to intervene. Jagan lands up at Abey's office and forces him to withdraw from brokering the deal with the Australian company, there by bringing massive profit to Nandan. In return, Nandan is profuse in his offer to Jagan, all of which he humbly disavows. Jagan finally demands Nandan a small favor. He wants Nandan to purchase a kovilakam at Kanimangalam, a village in Kerala, to which Nandan agrees.

Jagan also expresses his desire that the palace should be bought in the name of Nandan, and Jagan should be there as a benami of him. Jagannadhan reaches down at Kanimangalam  for the registration of the palace and the property surrounding it. Meanwhile, Kulappully Appan Thamburan, a feudal landlord with vested interests, opposes the purchase of the property. Appan lost his one eye after he got a slash with a sword between a fight at his younger age. Appan's sister was married to Dathan Thampuran of Kanimangalam palace, who deserted her one day. The extreme hatred towards Kanimangalam had made Appan to even stop the annual temple festival, which according to the villagers, has resulted in the anger of Goddess, the local deity.

With the arrival of Jagannathan, Appan is back again to create troubles, but Jagannathan tactfully overcomes it and gets the palace registered. Presently the palace is occupied by an old musician Krishna Varma and his foster daughter Unnimaya, but is disowned by the rest of his family members. Though, now in the hands of Jagan, he allows Varma and Unnimaya to stay in the palace. Though, initially, both Varma and Unnimaya felt uncomfortable in staying with Jagan, slowly, they develop an affection towards him. Within a short time, Jagan gets involved in the problems of the villagers, and they started considering him to the heir of the palace and their leader.

Jagannathan invites the ire of Appan Thamburan, with whom he clashes over the demolition of the palace, which he had earlier promised during the registration. Jagan, when he expresses his desire to stay at Kanimangalam, Appan sends his henchmen, who had to humiliatingly return from Jagan. Now, the villagers decide to hold up the annual festival at the temple, after a long gap of 16 years. Jagannathan takes up the leadership, and with the support of villagers, he starts the preparations. Within mean time, Unnimaya develops a closeness towards him. In the midst of this, Nayanthara, Jagan's close friend reaches Kanimangalam from Bangalore who expresses her desire to marry Jagan, which he declines, saying that he is now in love with Unnimaya.

Nayanthara accepts his decision and goes back, wishing him all the best for the future. According to the customs of the village, the festival puja should be done under a head priest from Keezhpayoor Mana. Still, when Appan Thamburan interferes, the members from Keezhpayoor refuses to conduct the puja, which makes Jagan to forcefully take the younger Namboothiri away from home on the way back. Suddenly Nandakumar lands down at Kanimangalam with his friends, one of whom harasses Unnimaya. This upsets Jagan, and, without Nandan's knowledge, he forcefully sends them back from Kanimangalam.

In the midst of this, the younger priest is taken away by Appan Thamburan's men. It is then revealed by Jagan that he is the son of the Kaloor Brahmadathan Namboothiripadu, the head priest of the temple, who died after being wrongly accused of stealing the divine ornaments of the Goddess. Jagan follows Ayinikad Namboothiri, the astrologer's instructions, and wears his Yagyopaveetham, the holy thread, and adopts back Brahmanyam. The day of the festival arrives. Nandan, who had gone in search of his friends, is now back in an inebriated condition and furiously demands Jagan to leave the palace.

Jagan pleads with him one day's time, but Nandan is not ready to listen. Finding no other option, Jagan locks up Nandan in a room and reaches the temple to perform the rituals. Kulappully Appan's henchmen attacks villagers. Jagan is helpless as he is supposed to control his emotions while performing the puja and holding the divine ornaments of the Goddess. The younger priest suddenly reappears and replaces Jagan in the puja so that Jagan can save the villagers. Jagan fights and saves the villagers, emerging as their leader. He then points his sword at Appan's neck and threatens to kill him if he ever comes back.

The festival concludes successfully, and the village is cheerful. Nandan is released, and Jagan announces to the cheering crowd that it is not him, but Nandakumar, the original owner of the Kanimangalam palace, and he is leaving the village with both Unnimaya and Krishna Varma, but Nanda Kumar, who is overwhelmed by seeing the affection of the people for Jagan, calls him back and hands over the ownership to him.

Cast

Soundtrack 

This film includes five songs written by Gireesh Puthenchery and one traditional song by Muthuswami Dikshitar. The songs are composed by Raveendran. The song were widely popular and topped the charts for months.  The song Harimuraliravam was picturized by director Priyadarshan as Shaji Kailas was on paternity break.

Reception

Box office 
The film was released in December 1997, which was subjected to high expectations, as it was the first collaboration between Mohanlal and Shaji Kailas. Upon its release, The film redefined the career of Shaji Kailas as a successful director. The film collected ₹4 lakhs (US$5,000) from first week, which was a record. In 1998, during the 250 days celebration of the film, Jayasurya was one among the ten fans who got the opportunity to garland Mohanlal as he went to the event as part of a mimicry show. It was also at the event that he received his first film offer from director Priyadarshan.

Critical response 
Padmanabha Venugopal of The Indian Express wrote, "The songs are ordinary, and the dialogue reminds us again of Devasuram as both scripts were authored by Ranjith. But it is an entertaining movie with brilliant acting from Lal, Manju and Narendra Prasad".

Awards 
The film won two Kerala State Film Awards—Best Background Music for Rajamani and Best Singer for K. J. Yesudas. Manju Warrier won her second consecutive Filmfare Award for Best Actress – Malayalam.

Kerala State Film Awards
Best Singer – K. J. Yesudas
Best Background Music – C. Rajamani

Filmfare Awards South
Best Actress in Malayalam – Manju Warrier
Screen Awards South
Best Actor in Malayalam – Mohanlal
Best Actress in Malayalam – Manju Warrier

References

External links 
 

1990s action drama films
1990s Malayalam-language films
1997 films
Films directed by Shaji Kailas
Films scored by Raveendran
Films shot at Varikkasseri Mana
Films shot in Ottapalam
Films shot in Thrissur
Films with screenplays by Ranjith
Indian action drama films